The Joyful Season is a 1964 Christmas album by Jo Stafford. It is unique in that it features Stafford accompanying herself as a vocal choir through the use of multitrack recording.  The album was reissued on CD in 2005 by DRG.

Track listing

Side 1
 "Little Drummer Boy"
 "Santa Claus Is Coming to Town"   
 "Deck the Halls"   
 "White Christmas"   
 "Jingle Bells"
 "Merry Christmas"

Side 2 
 "Christmas is the Season (of the Bells)"   
 "O Little Town of Bethlehem"    
 "Silver Bells"
 "Winter Wonderland"    
 "Silent Night"

CD bonus tracks 
 "Gesu Bambino"    
 "Ave Maria"
 "Christmas Medley #1: Hark the Herald Angels Sing/The First Noel/O Come All Ye Faithful" (with Gordon MacRae)
 "Christmas Medley #2: Joy to the World/It Came Upon a Midnight Clear" (with Gordon MacRae)
 "Toys for Tots"

References

Christmas albums by American artists
Jo Stafford albums
1964 Christmas albums
Capitol Records Christmas albums
Pop Christmas albums